Neck creaking or cracking of the neck is a clicking sound caused by movements of the neck. It can be a normal joint cracking or caused by arthrosis.

References 

Skeletal system